The table below shows results of Audi Sport during their time in the World Rally Championship.

Group B era (1981–1986)

Group A era (1987)

External links

WRC results
World Rally Championship constructor results